Yalghuz Aghaj Rural District is a rural district (dehestan) in Serishabad District, Qorveh County, Kurdistan Province, Iran. At the 2006 census, its population was 4,318, in 1,032 families. The rural district has 16 villages.

References 

Rural Districts of Kurdistan Province
Qorveh County